Harriet Duncan Hobart (1825–1898) was an American schoolteacher and women's rights advocate. After teaching in New York City, she moved to Minnesota and became an advocate for temperance and women's suffrage. She was president of the Minnesota Woman's Christian Temperance Union (WCTU) for thirteen years and urged the WCTU to work on behalf of women's rights more broadly.

Early life
Harriet A. Duncan, born in the north of Ireland in 1825, immigrated to the United States and arrived in New York City in 1843. She became a successful teacher, working in classrooms for twenty-five years. She also doubled as a principal for fifteen of those years.

In April 1868, Duncan moved to Red Wing, Minnesota, to marry a recently widowed Methodist Episcopal churchman, Chauncey Hobart. Chauncey was born in St. Albans, Vermont, on June 9, 1811. He served as a soldier in the American Indian Wars of 1831–1832. In 1836, Hobart joined the Illinois conference of the Methodist Episcopal Church and worked as an itinerant preacher in Illinois, Wisconsin, and Minnesota. He was chaplain of the House in the first Minnesota Territorial Legislature in 1849 and the Minnesota State Legislature in 1877. During the Civil War he was chaplain of the Third Minnesota Regiment. In 1885, he published Recollections of My Life: Fifty Years of Itinerancy in the Northwest.

Temperance Movement
Hobart became part of the Temperance movement in Minnesota. She took an active role in the 1874 Minnesota Woman's Christian Temperance Union (WCTU) convention in Red Wing. She was a speaker at the meeting, along with Julia Bullard Nelson and Elizabeth Hutchinson. These three WCTU leaders also believed women should have the right to vote, and argued successfully for a vote in support of women's suffrage.

In 1877, Hobart helped to organize the local Red Wing Woman's Christian Temperance Union. She became president and continued in that role for thirteen years. Her tenure as president was the longest in the group's history.

Hobart's 1891 speech before the Minnesota WCTU's Fifteenth Convention argued for women's rights broadly. She and other leaders were widening the scope of their organization. Some critics within the WCTU felt such efforts were a sideshow that weakened the struggle against liquor. But Hobart believed strongly in women's equality. Hobart, like many of her WCTU sisters, believed that getting the vote would empower women and eventually bring about equal rights. This strength would help them in their war on intoxicating beverages.

During her 1892 presidential address before the WCTU, Hobart told of the Union's power to influence others. She told members to share their views about regulation of the liquor traffic with every man they dealt with-husbands, brothers, sons, friends, merchants, and workmen.

Death
Hobart died in 1898 at age 74.

Notes

References

Angell, Madeline. Red Wing, Minnesota: Saga of a River Town. Minneapolis: Dillon Press, 1977.
"Historical Society Notes." Collections of the Minnesota Historical Society 9 (December 1928) 363.
Hobart, Harriet A. "Annual Address of the President," Minutes of the Fifteenth Annual Meeting of the W.C.T.U. of the State of Minnesota. Red Wing: The Journal Printers, 1891: 95.
———. Minutes of the Twentieth Annual Meeting of the W.C.T.U. of the State of Minnesota. Austin: Register Printers, 1896.
Hurd, Ethel Edgerton. Woman Suffrage in Minnesota: A Record of the Activities in Its Behalf since 1847. Minneapolis: Inland Press, 1916.

Scovell, Bessie Lathe. "President's Address," Minutes of the Twenty-Fourth Annual Meeting of the W.C.T.U. of the State of Minnesota. St. Paul: W.J. Woodbury, 1900.
Scovell, Bessie Lathe. Yesteryears: A Brief History of the Minnesota Woman's Christian Temperance Union from Its Organization, September 6, 1887 to 1939. St. Paul: WCTU, 1939.
Upham, Warren and Rose Barteau Dunlap. "Minnesota Biographies, 1615-1912," in Collections of the Minnesota Historical Society (June 1912) 14: 334.
Volstead, Andrew J. "The National Prohibition Act." Speech of A.J. Volstead of Minnesota in the House of Representatives, March 23, 1920. Washington: Government Printing Office, 1920.

Further reading
Kerr, Kathleen. "How Did the Reform Agenda of the Minnesota Woman's Christian Temperance Union Change, 1878–1917?" Binghamton: State University of New York, May 1998.

1825 births
1898 deaths
Schoolteachers from New York (state)
19th-century American women educators
American temperance activists
American women's rights activists
Irish emigrants to the United States (before 1923)
People from Red Wing, Minnesota
Woman's Christian Temperance Union people
19th-century American educators